Brown Rice, reissued as Don Cherry, is a studio album recorded in 1975 by trumpeter Don Cherry.

Overview
The album presents a fusion of jazz with rock, African, Indian, and Arabic music.

Reception

The Allmusic review by Steve Huey awarded the album 4½ stars stating "Brown Rice is the most accessible entry point into Cherry's borderless ideal, jelling into a personal, unique, and seamless vision that's at once primitive and futuristic in the best possible senses of both words. While Cherry would record a great deal of fine work in the years to come, he would never quite reach this level of wild invention again".

Brian Morton and Richard Cook, writing for The Penguin Guide to Jazz, called Brown Rice "a lost classic of the era and probably the best place to sample the trumpeter as both soloist – he blows some stunningly beautiful solos here – and as the shamanic creator of a unique, unearthly sound that makes dull nonsense of most fusion work of the period.… Exceptional and recommended." Previous editions of The Penguin Guide to Jazz gave the album a four-star rating, of a possible four.

Carl Braurer, writing for Cadence, suggested that the title track and "Degi-Degi" were the least successful tracks on the album, and would have benefited from shorter running times.  However, Braurer felt that overall, "this [album] is Cherry at his finest." The All Music Guide to Jazz, which reprinted Braurer's review, marked the album as a landmark recording.

Track listing
All compositions by Don Cherry except where noted
 "Brown Rice" - 5:15 
 "Malkauns" (Alejandro Jodorowsky, Bengt Berger, Don Cherry) - 14:02 
 "Chenrezig" - 12:51 
 "Degi-Degi" - 7:06 
Recorded at The Basement Recording Studios in New York (tracks 1, 2 & 4) and at Grog Kill in Woodstock (track 3)

Personnel
Don Cherry - trumpet, piano, electric piano, vocals
Frank Lowe - saxophone (tracks 1, 3 and 4)
Ricky Cherry - piano, electric piano (tracks 1, 3 and 4)
Charlie Haden - bass (tracks 1, 2 and 4)
Billy Higgins - drums 
Verna Gillis - vocals (track 1)
Bunchie Fox - bongos (track 1)
Hakim Jamil - bass (track 3)
Moki Cherry - tambura (track 2)

Carl Brauer noted apparent errors in the album's credits: "Don Cherry does not play trumpet on 'Brown Rice,' but he does play it on 'Degi-Degi,' and for the life of me I can't hear Frank Lowe's tenor on that track."

Additional personnel
Alejandro Jodorowsky - composer on "Malkauns"
Corrado Bacchelli - producer
Beppe Muccioli - associate producer
Stanley Crouch - liner notes

Release history 
The album was first titled Brown Rice. EMI Records originally released the album in Italy under this title. Horizon Records reissued the album in 1977, titled Don Cherry.  John Snyder and Rudy Van Gelder prepared a digital master at Van Gelder Studio in 1988, and in 1989 A&M Records released Brown Rice on compact disc.

References

External links
 

EMI Records albums
Horizon Records albums
Don Cherry (trumpeter) albums
1975 albums